Shobu Kapoor (born 28 May 1961) is a British actress of Indian descent.

Life and career
Shobu is most notable for playing the role of Gita Kapoor, the long-suffering wife of market trader Sanjay (Deepak Verma), in the BBC soap opera EastEnders from 1993 to 1998.

After leaving Eastenders, Kapoor appeared in the 2002 film Bend It Like Beckham and the TV series The Bill (2004). She has also been in Chicken Tikka Masala (2005), Casualty (2005) and Doctors, where she appeared as five characters between 2000 and 2556.

In 2006, she appeared in the BBC drama Banglatown Banquet and the Irish RTÉ soap Fair City (as Talayeh Kirmani). In 2007, she played the minor role of Umi in the Channel 4 drama Shameless. In 2008, she appeared in "Journey's End", the series four finale of Doctor Who, where her character perished at the hands of the Daleks.

Other film roles include Taj's mother in Van Wilder: The Rise of Taj (2006) and Mrs Khan in Mischief Night (2006). She portrayed the mother of Meredith Kercher in the TV film Amanda Knox: Murder on Trial in Italy (2011).

Kapoor played the roles of Shazia Malik in the BBC Asian Network radio soap Silver Street and Razia Khan in the BBC sitcom Citizen Khan. In 2015, she made a guest appearance in CBBC show Hank Zipzer.

In 2015, Kapoor was announced as part of the cast of Anthony Horowitz's play Dinner with Saddam on the West End.

In 2020, Kapoor appeared in The Other One as Mishti.

In 2021, Kapoor appeared in Casualty (series 35, episode 13) playing Mona Nadkarni, a 'friend' of Dr Rashid Masum's family, who was brought into the emergency department by Rash's father.

In 2022 she appeared as Lady Sheffield in the second season of Bridgerton on Netflix. She also appears in gangster granny strikes again.

References

External links

1961 births
20th-century British actresses
21st-century British actresses
British film actresses
British actresses of Indian descent
British radio actresses
British soap opera actresses
British television actresses
Living people
Place of birth missing (living people)